Salvitelle is a town and comune in the province of Salerno in the Campania region of southwestern Italy.

Geography 
The municipality borders with Auletta, Buccino, Caggiano, Romagnano al Monte and Vietri di Potenza (PZ).

Monuments and Places of Interest 

Chapel of St. Sebastian (1557-1558),
Church of SS. Rosario (1740),
Church of the Holy Spirit (1800),
Grassibelli Palace,
Mucci Palace,
Romanzi Palace,
Briganti Palace.

References

External links

Cities and towns in Campania
Localities of Cilento